Zapogon is a genus of fishes in the family Apogonidae, the cardinalfishes.

Species
The recognized species in this genus are:
 Zapogon evermanni (D. S. Jordan & Snyder, 1904) (Evermann's cardinalfish)
 Zapogon isus (J. E. Randall & J. E. Böhlke, 1981)

References

Apogoninae
Marine fish genera
Taxa named by Thomas H. Fraser